Major General Gustave Mario Ramaciotti,  (13 March 1861 – 6 December 1927) was an Australian law clerk, theatrical manager and soldier who was well known in Sydney's legal services.

Early life and career
Ramaciotti was born in Livorno, Italy, on 13 March 1861. He arrived in Queensland, Australia, in his teenage years, and in 1878 joined the Rockhampton Volunteers, Queensland Defence Force as a private. In 1880 he was naturalised. He became a law clerk and married Ada Wilson in 1882. As managing clerk of the conveyancing department of Minter Simpson & Co, he became well known in Sydney legal circles until his retirement from law in 1904. He became a partner in Australia's largest theatrical company with J. C. Williamson and George Tallis. After selling his shares in J C Williamson Ltd he bought the Theatre Royal, in King Street Sydney, the neighbouring Sutton's Hotel and adjoining land at the rear of these properties.

Military career
Ramaciotti's military interests continued and in 1890 he had been commissioned as a second lieutenant with the 2nd Infantry Regiment. By 1909 he was a lieutenant colonel commanding the 1st Battalion, 2nd Infantry Regiment. He went on to command the 24th Infantry (2nd Sydney Battalion) and was promoted to colonel in command of the 11th Infantry Brigade in 1914. During the First World War his duties were largely confined to home, but he eventually became Inspector General of administration at Army Headquarters, Melbourne. He was made a Companion of the Order of St Michael and St George in 1917, and on his retirement in 1920 he was made an honorary major general.

Death
Ramaciotti spent his remaining years travelling between Australia and Italy, until his death on a visit home to Australia on 6 December 1927. He was survived by his children Clive and Vera and his estate was sworn for probate in New South Wales at £91,485.

References

External links
 Australian Light Horse Studies Centre Gustave Mario RAMACIOTTI
 Australian Light Horse Studies Centre The Battle of Central Station, New South Wales, 14 February 1916

1861 births
1927 deaths
Australian Companions of the Order of St Michael and St George
Australian generals
Australian military personnel of World War I
Australian theatre managers and producers
Italian emigrants to Australia
Law clerks
People from Tuscany